The 1993 Caribbean Cup (known as the Shell Caribbean Cup for sponsorship reasons) was the fifth edition of the Caribbean Cup, the football championship of the Caribbean, one of the CONCACAF zones. The final stage was hosted by Jamaica.

The two finalists qualified for the 1993 CONCACAF Gold Cup.

Qualifying Tournament
 qualified as host country.

 qualified as winner of the 1992 Caribbean Cup.

Group 1
Played in Grenada.

Group 2
Played in Georgetown, Guyana.

Group 3

Group 4
Played in Anguilla.

Group 5
Played in Saint Kitts and Nevis.

Group 6
Played in Martinique, French Guiana and Guadeloupe.

Final tournament

First round

Group A

Group B

Semi-finals

3rd place match

Final

 and  qualified for 1993 CONCACAF Gold Cup.

References

Caribbean Cup
Caribbean Cup
International association football competitions hosted by Jamaica
1992–93 in Jamaican football